The 2012 Belarusian Premier League was the 22nd season of top-tier football in Belarus. It began on 24 March 2012 and ended on 25 November 2012. BATE Borisov were the defending champions, having won their 8th league title last year.

Teams

Dnepr Mogilev were relegated to the Belarusian First League after finishing the 2011 season in last place, leaving the league for the first time since the competition's establishment in 1992. They were replaced by 2011 First League champions Slavia Mozyr, who make their return to the league after a five-year absence.

Vitebsk, as the 11th-placed team, had to compete in the relegation/promotion playoffs against First League runners-up Partizan Minsk. Partizan Minsk won the playoff, 3–2 on aggregate, and returned to the league after a one-year absence while Vitebsk were relegated after six years in the top flight. In early 2012 Partizan was abandoned by their main sponsor Vladimir Romanov and consequently wasn't able to keep any of the first team players or obtain the Premier League license. Partizan withdrew from the Premier League, leaving it with only 11 teams.

Dinamo Brest changed their name to Brest due to troubles with further usage of Dinamo brand name.

Stadiums and locations

League table

Relegation playoffs
The 11th team of the league Torpedo-BelAZ Zhodino will play a two-legged relegation play-off against the runners-up of the 2012 Belarusian First League Gorodeya for one spot in the 2013 Premier League.

Results
Each team will play three times against every other team for a total of 30 matches.

First and second round

Third round

Top goalscorers

Updated to games played on 25 November 2012 Source: football.by

Awards

Player of the month

See also
2012 Belarusian First League
2011–12 Belarusian Cup
2012–13 Belarusian Cup

References

External links
 Official site 

Belarusian Premier League seasons
1
Belarus
Belarus